Megan is a proof of concept film that pays homage to the Cloverfield franchise. It was released on YouTube on July 31, 2018 and immediately went viral.

Synopsis 
When a young Scientist becomes entangled in a military mission to deliver the only antidote that will save mankind, she finds herself not only fighting for survival but also being confronted by demons from her past.

Production 
The film was produced by Jean de Meuron and Giuseppe Mercadante, with Olcun Tan producing the VFX. Once the script was ready and with the lookbook in hand director Greg Strasz, Giuseppe Mercadante and Jean de Meuron pitched the idea to several leading industry vendors. Companies like RED Digital Cinema, Helinet Aviation, International Studio Services, Dolby and Gradient Effects believed in their vision and decided to support their project. The script was written by Giuseppe Mercadante and Greg Strasz on a story written by Jean de Meuron, Giuseppe Mercadante and Greg Strasz.

The film was shot in 3 days at RED Digital Cinema Hollywood Studios, Helinet Aviation, the Los Angeles River, and Venice Beach. The heavy VFX work was done by Gradient Effects, known for their work on Stranger Things and Thor: Ragnarok. The "ashes" that are seen following the crash scene were previously used in Stranger Things' "upside-down world".

Reception 
On August 1, 2018, a day after release, the proof of concept went viral, picked up originally by Bloody Disgusting, SYFY, Screen Rant, the Spanish El Mundo, Geek Tyrant, then spread to several major publications like Indie Wire, Gizmodo, the French IGN, Empire, and PopSugar.

Accolades 
Megan has won awards at various festivals, including the HollyShorts Film Festival and London Short Film Festival.

References

External links 
MEGAN - 'CLOVERFIELD' - PROOF OF CONCEPT on YouTube

American short films
2018 short films
2010s English-language films